CSX Transportation , known colloquially as simply CSX, is a Class I freight railroad company operating in the Eastern United States and the Canadian provinces of Ontario and Quebec. The railroad operates on approximately 21,000 route miles of track. The company operates as the leading subsidiary of CSX Corporation, a Fortune 500 company headquartered in Jacksonville, Florida.

CSX Corporation (the parent of CSX Transportation) was formed in 1980 from the merger of Chessie System and Seaboard Coast Line Industries, two holding companies which controlled a number of railroads operating in the Eastern United States. Initially only a holding company itself, the subsidiaries that made up CSX Corporation were gradually merged, with this process completed in 1987. CSX Transportation formally came into existence in 1986, as the successor of Seaboard System Railroad. In 1999, CSX Transportation acquired approximately half of Conrail, in a joint purchase with competitor Norfolk Southern Railway. Later, in 2022, it acquired Pan Am Railways, extending its reach into much of Northern New England.

CSX and its chief competitor, the Norfolk Southern Railway, have a duopoly on the transcontinental freight rail lines in the Northeastern and Southern United States (South Atlantic and East South Central states).

History

Early years

CSX Corporation was formed on November 1, 1980, as a merger between Chessie System and Seaboard Coast Line Industries.

The name came about during merger talks between Chessie System and SCL, commonly called "Chessie" and "Seaboard". The company chairmen said it was important for the new name to include neither of those names because it was a partnership. Employees were asked for suggestions, most of which consisted of combinations of the initials. At the same time a temporary shorthand name was needed for discussions with the Interstate Commerce Commission. "CSC" was chosen but belonged to a trucking company in Virginia. "CSM" (for "Chessie-Seaboard Merger") was also taken. The lawyers decided to use "CSX", and the name stuck. In the public announcement, it was said that "CSX is singularly appropriate. C can stand for Chessie, S for Seaboard, and X, which actually has no meaning." However, an August 9, 2016, article on the Railway Age website stated that " ... the 'X' was for 'Consolidated' ". A fourth letter had to be added to CSX when used as a reporting mark because reporting marks that end in X means that the car is owned by a leasing company or private car owner.

The originator of SCL was the former Seaboard Air Line Railroad, which previously merged with the Atlantic Coast Line Railroad in 1967 to form the Seaboard Coast Line. In later years, it merged with the Louisville & Nashville Railroad, as well as several smaller subsidiaries such as the Clinchfield Railroad, Atlanta & West Point Railroad, Monon Railroad and the Georgia Railroad. From the late 1970s onward, these railroads were known collectively as the Family Lines. In 1982, they were merged into a single railroad, the Seaboard System Railroad.

The origin of the Chessie System was the former Chesapeake & Ohio Railway, which had merged with the Baltimore & Ohio Railroad, and the Western Maryland Railway.

Despite the merger in 1980, CSX was a paper railroad (meaning no CSX painted locomotives or rolling stock) until 1986. In that year, Seaboard System changed its name to CSX Transportation. On April 30, 1987, the B&O merged into the C&O. With the Western Maryland having already merged into the C&O, this left the C&O as the sole operating railroad under the Chessie System banner. Finally, on August 31, 1987, C&O/Chessie System merged into CSX Transportation, bringing all of the major CSX railroads under one banner.

Conrail acquisition
On June 23, 1997, CSX and Norfolk Southern Railway (NS) filed a joint application with the Surface Transportation Board for authority to purchase, divide, and operate the assets of the  Conrail, which had been created in 1976 by bringing together several ailing Northeastern railway systems into a government-owned corporation. On June 6, 1998, the STB approved the CSX–NS application and set August 22, 1998, as the effective date of its decision. CSX acquired 42 percent of Conrail's assets, and NS received the remaining 58 percent. CSX began operating its trains on its portion of the Conrail network on June 1, 1999. CSX now serves much of the Eastern United States, with a few routes into nearby Canadian cities.

In actuality, not all of Conrail was eliminated. There were a few parts of Conrail that both CSX and NS wanted, and neither wanted to allow the other to have total control over. Those small pieces remained owned by the renamed "Conrail Shared Assets," (later "Conrail Shared Assets Operations") so that the pieces were effectively owned and operated by a separate railroad owned by both railroads, thus neither railroad would control those pieces.

Into the 21st century
The company introduced its current slogan, "How Tomorrow Moves", in 2008.

In 2014, Canadian Pacific Railway approached CSX with an offer to merge the two companies, but CSX declined, and in 2015 Canadian Pacific made an attempt to purchase and merge with Norfolk Southern, but NS declined to do so as well.

In 2017, CSX announced Hunter Harrison would become its new chief executive officer; a settlement with activist investor Paul Hilal and Mantle Ridge. CSX added five new directors to their board, including Harrison and Mantle Ridge founder Paul Hilal. Mantle Ridge owns 4.9% of CSX. Harrison quickly moved to convert CSX rail operations to precision railroading. On December 14, 2017, CSX announced that Hunter Harrison was on medical leave. Two days after the announcement, Harrison died, one day after being hospitalized for complications of an ongoing illness. CSX initially saw a 10% drop in its stock price, but turned around to hit a new 52-week high less than a month later (January 2018).  Harrison's successors have continued the shift to precision railroading, with most hump yards converted to flat yards, low volume shipping lanes eliminated and reductions in rolling stock and work force.

Pan Am Railways acquisition
On November 30, 2020, CSX Transportation's parent company CSX Corporation announced on social media that they had come to an agreement with Pan Am Systems to purchase New England based Class II Pan Am Railways, pending regulatory approval from the Surface Transportation Board. The STB approved the purchase on April 14, 2022. As part of the acquisition, Norfolk Southern Railway will gain trackage rights over several CSX lines, and Pan Am Southern, 50 percent owned by Pan Am Railways, will be operated by the Berkshire and Eastern Railroad, a new Genesee & Wyoming subsidiary formed explicitly for this purpose. CSX completed the purchase on June 1, 2022.

Unit trains

CSX operated the Juice Train which consisted of Tropicana cars that carried fresh orange juice between Bradenton, Florida, and the Greenville section of Jersey City, New Jersey. The northbound train was originally designated on CSX as K650 during the 1990s, and Q740 in the 2000s. The Juice Train has previously been studied as a model of efficient rail transportation that can compete with trucks and other modes in the perishable-goods trade. The train was abolished in 2017 north of Tampa, Florida, and now mixed freight trains deliver the cars to their respective destinations. It still operates between Bradenton and Tampa however, but is designated as local O823.

CSX operates Coke Express unit trains. They carry coke for steelmaking, power generation and other various uses, running between Pittsburgh and Chicago, and other places in the Rust Belt.

Locomotives

CSX has rebuilt a significant number of locomotives. Some of the EMD GP38-2, GP40-2, and SD40-2 have been rebuilt to Dash 3 standards with updated Wabtec Electronically Controlled Air Brakes, air conditioning, automated starting controls, a crash safe cab, a new electronic control stand, and Positive Train Control (PTC). In 2019, 25 SD70AC locomotives were rebuilt at the CSX Huntington Heavy Repair Facility, with rebuilt prime movers, in-cab electronic and comfort improvements, New York Air Brake CCB II airbrake systems, and new Mitsubishi drive controls. CSX has also partnered with Wabtec to rebuild GE locomotives at their Fort Worth facility with prime movers upgraded to the FDL Advantage spec and new electronic controls such as the Wabtec Trip Optimizer Zero-to-Zero system.

CSX has also obtained a few EMD F40PH-2s—nos. 9992, 9993, 9998, and 9999 (All locomotives except 9999 have been renumbered to CSX 1, 2, and 3 and were repainted into a heritage Baltimore and Ohio Railroad scheme)—that were retired from Amtrak for executive office car service and geometry trains. Another locomotive, ex-MARC GP40WH-2 no. 9969 was acquired for the same purpose.

With the arrival of Hunter Harrison, CSX has begun to store many locomotives. By the end of 2017, CSX plans to store or retire all of the GE CW40-8, CW40-9, CW60AC, CW60AH, CW46AH, EMD SD50, SD50-2, SD50-3, SD60, SD60M, SD60I, SD70M, SD70AC, and SD70AE (SD70ACe) units. Most of the GE C40-8, B40-8, and B20-8 units stored in Corbin, Kentucky, have already been retired and sold off. Even with the passing of Harrison, his replacement, James Foote, confirmed the locomotives would still be retired.

CSX ordered ten SD70ACe-T4s in August 2018, which were delivered in July the following year. They are classified as ST70AHs. CSX also has a contract with Wabtec for modernizing their fleet of CW44s. The modernized locomotives, nearly thirty in number as of June 2020, are being classified as CM44AC.

On April 30, 2019, CSX unveiled locomotives 911 and 1776, two locomotives created to honor the first responders and veterans. Another special unit, CSX 3194, was unveiled on August 22, 2019, in honor of the law enforcement.

Safety
In 1995, CSX started a new liability insurance requirement of $200 million to introduce their official policy, "no steam on its own wheels", banning the operation of steam locomotives and other antique rail equipment on their trackage due to safety concerns, and increased risk.

List of accidents and incidents
1986 Miamisburg, Ohio, train derailment
1993 Big Bayou Canot rail accident, near Mobile, Alabama
1996 Maryland train collision, in Silver Spring, Maryland
1997 West Virginia train collision; one killed
2000 Tennga, Georgia bus–train collision; 3 killed, 4 injured
2001 CSX 8888 incident, in northwest Ohio, 1 minor injury. This was the inspiration for the 2010 action film Unstoppable
2001 Howard Street Tunnel fire, in Baltimore, Maryland
2007 Brooks derailment, in Brooks, Kentucky
2011 Mineral Springs, North Carolina, train wreck-fire involving 2 (Union Pacific) units and its train of fuel tankers at the back, 2 killed
2012 Ellicott City, Maryland, train derailment, two killed
2013 Spuyten Duyvil derailment	
2014 Midnight Rider train incident
2015 Mount Carbon train derailment, Mount Carbon, West Virginia
2015 Tennessee train derailment, Maryville, Tennessee
2017 Biloxi, Mississippi collision with tour bus stuck on tracks; 4 killed, 44 injured
2017 Pittsburgh suburb coal cars derailment
2017 Hyndman, Pennsylvania derailment, chemical release and fire
2017 Atlanta derailment destroys occupied home
2018 Cayce, South Carolina, train collision involving Amtrak Silver Star and a CSX autorack train (Q210-03). 2 dead, 116 injured.
2018 Worcester, Massachusetts, derailment – On July 21, 2018, a CSX Intermodal train from Worcester, Massachusetts, hits a low overpass, causing 12 cars to derail. One car nearly crashed into a car full of toxic chemicals, engineer injured.
2021 Barnsley, Kentucky, tornado – On December 10, 2021, a tornado struck and derailed a CSX train, throwing several cars uphill, including one that landed on a house.

Major yards

Hump yards
In hump yards, trains are slowly pushed over a small hill as cars are uncoupled at the crest of the hill and allowed to roll down the hump into the appropriate tracks for outbound trains.
Avon, Indiana – Avon Yard
Cincinnati, Ohio – Queensgate Yard
Nashville, Tennessee – Radnor Yard 
Selkirk, New York – Selkirk Yard
Waycross, Georgia – Rice Yard

See also

 
History of railroads in Michigan
List of CSX Transportation lines
List of CSX Transportation predecessor railroads
National Gateway
Railex (refrigerated rail service – CSX and Union Pacific Railroad)
Union Pacific Railroad
Holiday Junction#Duke Energy Holiday Trains

References

Bibliography
 
CSX Transportation Timetables
FRA Highway-Rail Crossing Inventory Files

External links

 
 CSX scanner frequencies
 CSX Dispatcher code cross-reference table
 New intermodal facility in Quebec

 
Companies based in Jacksonville, Florida
Alabama railroads
Connecticut railroads
Delaware railroads
Washington, D.C., railroads
Florida railroads
Georgia (U.S. state) railroads
Indiana railroads
Kentucky railroads
Louisiana railroads
Maine railroads
Maryland railroads
Massachusetts railroads
Michigan railroads
Mississippi railroads
Missouri railroads
New Hampshire railroads
New Jersey railroads
New York (state) railroads
North Carolina railroads
Ohio railroads
Ontario railways
Pennsylvania railroads
Quebec railways
South Carolina railroads
Tennessee railroads
Vermont railroads
Virginia railroads
West Virginia railroads
Railroads in the Chicago metropolitan area
Economy of the Eastern United States
Class I railroads in North America
Railway companies established in 1986
American companies established in 1986
1986 establishments in North America
Illinois railroads
Atlantic Coast Line Railroad
Seaboard Air Line Railroad